Saint-Josse was a church in Paris, France.

Location

History
Thus, an additional church was built in 1235. It was made a full parish by the Bishop of Paris Renaud de Corbeil in 1260.

Around 1300, the estimated parish population was 1,020 inhabitants in 30 houses aligned on two streets.

The Church of Saint Josse, used by the gardeners' fellowship, was re-built in 1679. It was closed in 1791, sold and demolished in 1792. The small building was shown on the 1737 Turgot map of Paris.

References

Roman Catholic churches in the 10th arrondissement of Paris
Former Roman Catholic church buildings
Destroyed churches in France
Former buildings and structures in Paris
1792 disestablishments in France